Kazakhstan competed at the 1998 Winter Olympics in Nagano, Japan.

Medalists

Alpine skiing

Men

Women

Biathlon

Men

Men's 4 × 7.5 km relay

Women

Women's 4 × 7.5 km relay

 1 A penalty loop of 150 metres had to be skied per missed target.
 2 One minute added per missed target.

Cross-country skiing

Men

 1 Starting delay based on 10 km results. 
 C = Classical style, F = Freestyle

Men's 4 × 10 km relay

Women

 2 Starting delay based on 5 km results. 
 C = Classical style, F = Freestyle

Women's 4 × 5 km relay

Figure skating

Men

Pairs

Ice dancing

Freestyle skiing

Men

Women

Ice hockey

Men's tournament

Preliminary round - Group A
Top team (shaded) advanced to the first round.

First round - Group D

Quarterfinal

Leading scorers

Team roster
Aleksandr Koreshkov
Konstantin Shafranov
Mikhail Borodulin
Yevgeniy Koreshkov
Vladimir Zavyalov
Igor Zemlyanov
Dmitriy Dudarev
Andrey Pchelyakov
Andrey Sokolov
Pavel Kamentsev
Vitaly Tregubov
Vadim Glovatsky
Andrey Savenkov
Vladimir Antipin
Piotr Deviatkin
Igor Dorohkin
Alexander Shimin
Alexey Trochshinsky
Vitaliy Yeremeyev

Ski jumping 

Men's team large hill

 1 Four teams members performed two jumps each.

Speed skating

Men

Women

References
Official Olympic Reports
International Olympic Committee results database
 Olympic Winter Games 1998, full results by sports-reference.com

Nations at the 1998 Winter Olympics
1998
1998 in Kazakhstani sport